The Temple of the Sacred Tooth Relic or Sri Dalada Maligawa, is a Buddhist temple in Kandy, Sri Lanka. It is located in the royal palace complex of the former Kingdom of Kandy, which houses the relic of the tooth of the Buddha. Since ancient times, the relic has played an important role in local politics because it is believed that whoever holds the relic holds the governance of the country. The relic was historically held by Sinhalese kings. The temple of the tooth is a World Heritage Site mainly due to the temple and the relic.

Bhikkhus of the two particular chapters, the Malwathu chapters and Asgiri chapters, conduct daily worship in the inner chamber of the temple. Rituals are performed three times daily: at dawn, at noon and in the evenings. On Wednesdays, there is a symbolic bathing of the relic with a herbal preparation made from scented water and fragrant flowers called Nanumura Mangallaya; this holy water is believed to contain healing powers and is distributed to those present.

The temple sustained damage from bombings by Janatha Vimukthi Peramuna in 1989, and by the Liberation Tigers of Tamil Eelam in 1998. However, it was fully restored each time.

History

After the Maha parinirvana of Gautama Buddha, according to the legend, the tooth relic was preserved in Kalinga and smuggled to the island by Princess Hemamali and her husband, Prince Dantha on the instructions of her father King Guhasiva. Hemmamali hid the relic in her hair on the way to the island. They landed on the island in Lankapattana during the reign of Sirimeghavanna of Anuradhapura (301-328) and handed over the tooth relic. The king enshrined it in Meghagiri Vihara (present day Isurumuniya) in Anuradhapura. Safeguarding the relic was the responsibility of the monarch from then, therefore over the years, the custodianship of relic came to symbolize the right to rule the island. Therefore, reigning monarchs built the tooth relic temples quite close to their royal residences, as was the case during the times of the Anuradhapura Kingdom, Kingdom of Polonnaruwa, and Kingdom of Dambadeniya. During the era of the Kingdom of Gampola, the relic was housed in Niyamgampaya Vihara. It is reported in the messenger poems such as Hamsa, Gira, and Selalihini that the temple of tooth relic was situated within the city of Sri Jayawardenepura Kotte when the Kingdom of Kotte was established there.

During the reign of Dharmapala of Kotte, the relic was moved and was hidden in Delgamuwa Vihara, Ratnapura, in a grinding stone. It was brought to Kandy by Hiripitiye Diyawadana Rala and Devanagala Rathnalankara Thera. King Vimaladharmasuriya I built a two-storey building to deposit the tooth relic and the building is now gone. In 1603 when the Portuguese kingdom invaded Kandy, it was carried to Meda Mahanuwara in Dumbara. It was recovered in the time of Rajasinha II and it has been reported that he reinstated the original building or built a new temple. The present-day temple of the tooth was built by Vira Narendra Sinha. The octagonal Paththirippuwa and moat were added during the reign of Sri Vikrama Rajasinha. The royal architect Devendra Moolacharya is credited with building the Paththirippuwa. Originally it was used by the king for recreational activities and later it was offered to the tooth relic, it now houses the temple's library.

Attacks on the building

The temple was attacked in 1989 by the militant organisation Janatha Vimukthi Peramuna (JVP); it had the intention of capturing the relic. And in 1998 by the militant organisation Liberation Tigers of Tamil Eelam (LTTE); this attack damaged the front side of the royal palace.

Architecture 

The brick wall which runs along the moat and the Bogambara lake is known as the water waves wall. Holes in this wall are built to light coconut oil lamps. The main entrance gate which lies over the moat is called Mahawahalkada. At the foot of Mahawahalkada steps, there is a Sandakada pahana (moonstone) which is carved in Kandyan architectural style. Mahawahalkada was totally destroyed in a 1998 bomb blast and rebuilt afterwards along with Sandakada pahana other stone carvings. Elephants are depicted in stone on either side of the entrance. A Makara Torana and two guardian stones are placed on top of the staircase. TheHewisi drummers' chamber is situated in front of the main shrine. The two storeys of the main shrine are known as "Palle malaya" (lower floor) and "Udu malaya" (upper floor) or "Weda hitina maligawa". The doors of the Weda Hitana Maligawa are Ivory carvings. The actual chamber in which the tooth relic is kept is known as the "Handun kunama".

The golden canopy over the main shrine and the golden fence which encircles the temple complex, was built in 1987 by then Prime Minister, Ranasinghe Premadasa. The tooth relic is encased in seven golden caskets which are engraved with precious gemstones. The casket represent a stupa; the procession casket which is used during the Kandy Esala Perahera is also displayed in the same chamber.

Associated buildings and structures

Royal Palace

The royal palace is situated to the north of the temple. John Pybus, who was on an embassy in 1762, gives a detailed description of the royal palace. Vikramabahu III of Gampola (r. 1356-1374) and Sena Sammatha Wickramabahu of Kandy (r. 1469-1511) built royal palaces on this site. Vimaladharmasuriya I of Kandy undertook various decorations to the palace. The Dutch orientalist Philippus Baldaeus visited the palace with General Gerard Pietersz Hulft in 1656. The royal residence was known as "Maha Wasala" in Sinhalese starting in the Polonnaruwa period. The royal palace is also known as "Maligawa" (Palace). The section of the palace facing the Natha Devale is said to be the oldest. During the beginning of the British period, it was used by the government agent Sir John D'Oyly, 1st Baronet, of Kandy. Successors of D'Oyly have continued to use it as their official residence. Today it is preserved as an archaeological museum. Ulpen Ge and Queens Palace are the associated buildings of the palace.

Audience hall

The audience hall or magul maduwa is where the Kandyan kings held their court. It was completed during the reign of Sri Vikrama Rajasinha. The carvings of the wooden pillars which support the wooden roof are an example of wood carving of the Kandyan period. Sri Rajadhi Rajasinha of Kandy built it in 1783. The hall was renovated for the reception of arrival of Albert Edward, Prince of Wales in 1872. Other nearby buildings to the halls believed to be demolished during the British rule. The audience hall was the venue where the Kandyan Convention was drawn up, it was where the convention was read out to the people and where the conference, about the convention, was held on 2 March 1815. That space was later used to erect the Kandy Kachcheri and Kandy Supreme Court. Today it is used for state ceremonies and conserved under the department of archaeology.

Mahamaluwa
Mahamaluwa is public who came to see the annual Esala perahera. Today it contains a statue of Madduma Bandara. The memorial which contains the skull of Keppetipola Disawe is another attraction. The statue of Princess Hemamali and Prince Dantha are also located here.

See also
Buddha Tooth Relic Temple and Museum
Cetiya
Constantino of Braganza
Dāṭhavaṃsa
Diyawadana Nilame (chief lay custodian)
Esala Perahera
Gaspar Jorge de Leão Pereira
Relics in Sri Lanka associated with Buddha
Relic of the tooth of the Buddha

Notes

Citations

Sources

Journals

External links 

 Sri Dalada Maligawa Official website
 ශ්‍රී දළදා මාළිගාවේ දියඅගල
The Kandy Esala Perahera
The Kandy Esala Perahera Magnificent Pageant

Buddhist pilgrimage sites in Sri Lanka
Buddhist temples in Kandy
Kingdom of Kandy
Archaeological protected monuments in Kandy District
Buddhist relics